Viggo Peter Mortensen Jr. R (born October 20, 1958) is an American actor, writer, director, producer, musician, and multimedia artist. Born and raised in the State of New York to a Danish father and American mother, he also lived in Argentina during his childhood. He is the recipient of various accolades, including a Screen Actors Guild Award, and has been nominated for three Academy Awards, three BAFTA Awards, and four Golden Globe Awards.

Mortensen made his film debut in a small role in Peter Weir's 1985 thriller Witness, which starred Harrison Ford and was set in Amish country. He appeared in several notable films, including The Indian Runner (1991), Carlito's Way (1993), Crimson Tide (1995), Daylight (1996), The Portrait of a Lady (1996), G.I. Jane (1997), Psycho (1998 remake), A Perfect Murder (1998), A Walk on the Moon (1999), and 28 Days (2000).

Mortensen received international attention in the early 2000s for his role as Aragorn in the epic fantasy adventure trilogy The Lord of the Rings. In 2005, Mortensen won critical acclaim for his acting in David Cronenberg's crime thriller A History of Violence. Two years later, Mortensen earned acclaim in another Cronenberg film, Eastern Promises (2007); he was nominated for the Academy Award for Best Actor. A third teaming with Cronenberg in A Dangerous Method (2011) resulted in a nomination for the Golden Globe Award for Best Supporting Actor – Motion Picture for his portrayal of pioneer psychiatrist Sigmund Freud. Other well-received films include Appaloosa (2008) and Far from Men (2014). He gained additional Academy Award nominations for his leading roles in Captain Fantastic (2016) and Green Book (2018), the latter of which won Best Picture.

Aside from acting, Mortensen has explored fine arts, photography, poetry, and music. In 2002, he founded the Perceval Press to publish the works of little-known artists and authors.

Early life 
Mortensen was born in Watertown, New York on October 20, 1958, the son of Grace Gamble (July 8, 1928 – April 25, 2015) and Viggo Peter Mortensen Sr. (May 8, 1929 – March 2, 2017). His mother was American, while his father was Danish. They met in Norway. His maternal grandfather was a Canadian from Nova Scotia. His paternal grandmother was from Trondheim, Norway.

The family moved to Venezuela, then Denmark, and eventually settled in Argentina. They lived successively in the provinces of Córdoba, Chaco, and Buenos Aires. Mortensen attended primary school and acquired a fluent proficiency in Spanish while his father managed poultry farms and ranches. He was baptized Lutheran, the tradition of his father.

When Mortensen was 11 and his brothers 8 and 6, their parents divorced. The three boys returned with their mother to the United States, where Viggo spent the rest of his childhood in New York State. He graduated from Watertown High School in 1976. He attended St. Lawrence University in Canton, New York, earning a bachelor's degree in 1980 in Spanish studies and politics.

Upon graduating, Mortensen went to Europe, living for a time in the United Kingdom and Spain, before returning to Denmark. There he took various jobs such as driving trucks in Esbjerg and selling flowers in Copenhagen. He eventually returned to the United States to pursue an acting career.

Acting career

1980s–1990s: First films 
Mortensen's first film role was in The Purple Rose of Cairo (1985), but his scenes were deleted from the final cut. His first onscreen appearance was playing an Amish farmer in Peter Weir's Witness. He was cast in Witness because the director thought he had the right face for the part of an Amish man. He had also been simultaneously cast for another role as a soldier in Shakespeare in the Park's production of Henry V, but he decided to choose acting in the film because he wanted to try something new. He credited that decision and the very positive experience on the film as the start of his film career.

Also in 1985, he was cast in the role of Bragg on the TV series Search for Tomorrow. Mortensen's 1987 performance in Bent at the Coast Playhouse, Los Angeles, won him a Dramalogue Critics' Award. The play, about homosexual prisoners in a concentration camp,  was known for the leading performance by Ian McKellen. Mortensen later costarred with him in the film trilogy The Lord of the Rings. In 1987, Mortensen guest starred as a police detective on the hit TV series Miami Vice.

During the 1990s, Mortensen appeared in supporting roles in a variety of films, including Jane Campion's The Portrait of a Lady, Young Guns II, Prison, Boiling Point, Leatherface: The Texas Chainsaw Massacre III, Sean Penn's The Indian Runner, Danny Cannon's The Young Americans, Carl Colpaert's The Crew, which won the São Paulo Film Festival Audience Award, Brian de Palma's Carlito's Way,  Crimson Tide, G.I. Jane, Daylight, A Walk on the Moon, American Yakuza, Charles Robert Carner's remake Vanishing Point, Philip Ridley's films The Reflecting Skin and The Passion of Darkly Noon, the remake films A Perfect Murder and Gus Van Sant's Psycho (the 1998 remakes of two Alfred Hitchcock's movies Dial M for Murder and Psycho), 28 Days, and The Prophecy, with Christopher Walken. Of these roles, Mortensen was probably best known for playing Master Chief John Urgayle in G.I. Jane.

2000s: The Lord of the Rings and breakthrough 

Another major mainstream breakthrough came in 1999, when Peter Jackson cast him as Aragorn in The Lord of the Rings film trilogy. According to the Special Extended Edition DVD of The Lord of the Rings: The Fellowship of the Ring, Mortensen was a last-minute replacement for Stuart Townsend, and would not have taken the part of Aragorn had it not been for his son's enthusiasm for the J. R. R. Tolkien novel. He received critical acclaim for his portrayal of Aragorn, and was ranked No. 15 on a 2015 survey of "The 100 Greatest Movie Characters" conducted by Empire.

In The Two Towers DVD extras, the film's swordmaster, Bob Anderson, described Mortensen as "the best swordsman I've ever trained." Mortensen often performed his own stunts, and even the injuries he sustained during several of them, including two broken toes, did not dampen his enthusiasm. At one point during shooting of The Two Towers, Mortensen, Orlando Bloom, and Brett Beattie (stunt double for John Rhys-Davies) all had painful injuries, and during a shoot of them, running in the mountains, Peter Jackson jokingly referred to the three as "the walking wounded." Also, according to the Special Extended Edition DVD of The Lord of the Rings: The Return of the King, Mortensen purchased the two horses, Uraeus and Kenny, whom he rode and bonded with over the duration of the films. In May 2020, during the COVID-19 pandemic, Mortensen joined other stars from The Lord of the Rings for actor Josh Gad's YouTube series Reunited Apart, which reunites the cast of popular movies through video-conferencing, and promotes donations to non-profit charities.

In 2004, Mortensen starred as Frank Hopkins in Hidalgo, the story of an ex-army courier who travels to Arabia to compete with his horse, Hidalgo, in a dangerous desert race for a contest prize.

In 2005, Mortensen starred in David Cronenberg's movie A History of Violence as a family man revealed to have had an unsavory previous career. He was nominated for a Satellite Award for Outstanding Actor in a Motion Picture for this role. In the DVD extras for A History of Violence, Cronenberg related that Mortensen is the only actor he had come across who would come back from weekends with his family with items he had bought to use as props on the set. 

In 2006, he starred as Captain Diego Alatriste in the Spanish language film Alatriste, based on the series of novels The Adventures of Captain Alatriste, written by the Spanish writer Arturo Pérez-Reverte.

In September 2007, the film Eastern Promises, directed by David Cronenberg, was released to critical acclaim for the film itself and for Mortensen's performance as a Russian gangster on the rise in London. His nude fight scene in a steam room was applauded by Roger Ebert: "Years from now, it will be referred to as a benchmark." Mortensen's performance in Eastern Promises resulted in his winning the Best Performance by an Actor in a British Independent Film award from the British Independent Film Awards. He was also nominated for an Academy Award for Best Actor.

In 2009, Mortensen appeared as himself in the film Reclaiming The Blade, in which he discussed his passion for the sword and his sword-work in films such as The Lord of the Rings and Alatriste. Mortensen also talked about his work with Bob Anderson, the swordmaster on The Lord of the Rings, Alatriste, Pirates of the Caribbean and many others.

In 2009, Mortensen performed in The People Speak, a documentary feature film that uses dramatic and musical performances of the letters, diaries, and speeches of everyday Americans, based on historian Howard Zinn's A People's History of the United States. While it was reported in April 2009 that Mortensen had, at least temporarily, retired from film acting, Mortensen said he was misquoted. In a 2012 interview, he denied that he ever said he was retiring, only that he didn't have "plans to do another movie" at the time and that he was "taking a little break now. I don't have anything lined up." In 2009 he joined the cast of The Road, a film adaptation of the Cormac McCarthy novel of the same name, and collaborated with David Cronenberg for a third time on A Dangerous Method.

2010s–present: Critical acclaim 
After two years, Mortensen returned to theater in 2011, starring in Ariel Dorfman's Purgatorio in Madrid.

Mortensen starred in the 2016 film Captain Fantastic and the 2018 film Green Book, for which he received his second and third Academy Award nominations.

In 2020 he released his directorial debut Falling which he also wrote, produced, composed the score and starred in alongside Lance Henriksen.

Mortensen was cast as British cave diver Rick Stanton in the biographical film Thirteen Lives directed by Ron Howard which was released in July 2022.

He reunited with David Cronenberg in the horror sci-fi film Crimes of the Future alongside Kristen Stewart with filming beginning in August 2021. Mortensen will also reunite with Lisandro Alonso on the film Eureka. Mortensen and Caleb Landry Jones will star together in the Vietnam War thriller Two Wolves which will be directed by documentary filmmaker Alex Gibney.

He will star and direct in a Western film which he wrote, starring Vicky Krieps later in the year titled The Dead Don't Hurt, with shooting to commence in Mexico.

Literary and arts career

Perceval Press 
With part of his earnings from The Lord of the Rings, Mortensen founded the Perceval Press publishing house—named after the knight from the legend of King Arthur—to help other artists by publishing works that might not find a home in more traditional publishing venues.

Perceval Press is also the home of Mortensen's many personal artistic projects in the area of fine arts, photography, poetry, song, and literature (see below).

Bibliography 
Mortensen is also an author, with various books of poetry, photography, and painting published. With anthropologists Federico Bossert and Diego Villar, he has written several works related to ethnography of natives in South America, specifically in Argentina, Brazil, Paraguay, and Uruguay. Some of the published books co-authored by Mortensen are Sons of the Forest and Skovbo. Mortensen's bibliography includes:
 Ten Last Night – (1993), his first collection of poetry.
 Recent Forgeries – (1998), ISBN, 5th Edition, documents Viggo's first solo exhibition and includes a CD with music and spoken-word poetry. Introduction by Dennis Hopper.
 Errant Vine – (2000), limited edition booklet of an exhibit at the Robert Mann Gallery.
 Hole in the Sun – (2002, ISBN), color and black & white photographs of a back yard swimming pool.
 SignLanguage – (2002 ISBN), a catalog from an exhibition of his works, combining photographs, paintings, and poetry into a multimedia diary of his time in New Zealand while filming The Lord of the Rings: The Fellowship of the Ring. Introduction by Kevin Power.
 Coincidence of Memory – (2002, ISBN) Third Edition. In this book, the artist combines photographs, paintings, and poems that cover his artistic output from 1978 to 2002.
 Mo Te Upoko-o-te-ika/For Wellington – (2003), ISBN, a book to accompany the joint exhibitions at Massey University and the Wellington City Gallery during the premiere of The Lord of the Rings: The Return of the King.
 45301 – (2003), ISBN. Abstract images, fragments, and phrases from poems are comprised in this photography book. Many of the photographs were shot during travels to Morocco, Cuba, and the northern plains of the United States.
 Un hueco en el sol – (2003), a small booklet published to accompany the exhibition "Un hueco en el sol" at the Fototeca de Cuba in Havana. In Spanish.
 Miyelo – (2003), a series of panoramic photographs of a Lakota Ghost Dance. It also tells about the events leading up to the massacre at Wounded Knee.
 Nye Falsknerier – (2003). Paintings and poems translated into Danish from Ten Last Night, Recent Forgeries, Coincidence of Memory.
 The Horse is Good – (2004), ISBN, a photography book, partly shot during his work on the film Hidalgo, about horses as partners, teachers, and fellow travelers. Images from Morocco, South Dakota, Montana, California, Iceland, New Zealand, Denmark, Brazil, and Argentina. This book reflects Mortensen's fondness for horses. In fact, he bought Uraeus—the horse who played Brego, Aragorn's steed (Roheryn in the books) in The Lord of the Rings movies—as well as TJ, one of the horses who played Hidalgo. He also purchased the stallion that played Arwen's horse, a gray Andalusian stallion named Florian, and gave it to the stunt woman, Jane Abbott, who rode the horse in place of Liv Tyler.
 Linger – (2005). In this book, the artist combines black and white photographs and prose poems. Images from Spain (partly shot during his work on the film Alatriste), Morocco, Iceland, United States, Denmark ...
 I Forget You For Ever – (2006). Texts and photographs.
 Skovbo – (2008). Collection of photographs, poems (in English, Spanish and Danish) and quotes.
 Sådanset – (2008). A small booklet published to accompany the exhibition Sådanset (October 18 – November 16, 2008) at the Palæfløjen in Roskilde (Denmark).
 Canciones de Invierno – Winter Songs – (2010). Collection of photographs and poems. Bilingual : in Spanish and English. It includes new texts (most of the poems and all the translations) and revised versions of texts previously published. They're accompanied by pictures of landscapes taken during the previous two winters.
 That Turned Ugly Fast  – (2015), ISBN, Poems by Mark Berriman, with a foreword by Viggo Mortensen. Ramas Para Un Nido – (2017). Collection of photos comprising a "distillation of isolated instances".

 Visual arts and discography 
Mortensen is a painter and photographer. His paintings are frequently abstract and often contain fragments of his poetry therein. His paintings have been featured in galleries worldwide, and many of the paintings of the artist he portrayed in A Perfect Murder are his own.

Mortensen experiments with his poetry and music by mixing the two art forms. He has collaborated with guitarist Buckethead on several albums, mostly released on his own label (Perceval Press) or TDRS Music. Viggo was first introduced to Buckethead's work while working on sounds for an educational CD on Greek mythology. The finished product included a guitar part by Buckethead, which caught Viggo's ear and led him to initiate contact with the guitarist. The collaboration grew from there.

Mortensen's discography includes:

 1994: Don't Tell Me What to Do 1997: One Less Thing to Worry About 1998: Recent Forgeries 1999: The Other Parade 1999: One Man's Meat 1999: Live at Beyond Baroque 2003: Pandemoniumfromamerica 2004: Live at Beyond Baroque II 2004: Please Tomorrow 2004: This, That, and the Other 2005: Intelligence Failure 2006: 3 Fools 4 April 2007: Time Waits for Everyone 2008: At All 2010: Canciones de Invierno 2011: Reunion 2013: Acá 2015: Under the Weather 2016: Seventeen Odd Songs 2017: Preguntas Desde la Orilla 2018: Godzilla Sleeps AloneMortensen is featured on The Lord of the Rings: The Return of the King soundtrack, singing "Aragorn's Coronation" (the name of the extended version of this song in the 3rd original sound track is "The Return of the King"), the words by Tolkien and the music composed by Mortensen. In the extended DVD edition of the first Lord of the Rings movie, The Fellowship of the Ring, he sings the song "The Lay of Beren and Lúthien". His poems are written in English, Danish, and Spanish.

 Personal life 

 Family and relationships 
Mortensen holds dual American and Danish citizenship. He has stated that he was raised speaking English and Spanish, and sometimes feels that, when speaking Spanish, he "can get to the heart of the matter better".

Mortensen met singer Exene Cervenka in 1986 on the set of the comedy Salvation! The couple married on July 8, 1987. On January 28, 1988, Cervenka gave birth to their son, named Henry Blake Mortensen, who later played his on-screen son in the film Crimson Tide in 1995. Henry graduated from Columbia University in 2010 with a B.A. in Archaeology and has been working at Perceval Press, founded by his father. Mortensen and Cervenka lived in Idaho for three years. They separated in 1992 and divorced in 1997. Since 2009, he has been in a relationship with Spanish actress Ariadna Gil. Though the couple reside in Madrid, Mortensen spends much of his time in the United States, and has stated, "I am a citizen and longtime resident of the United States and am attached to its landscapes, history, and people." He has owned property in Sandpoint, Idaho, and spends time there when not filming movies.

Mortensen has talked about his family's struggles with dementia, seeing both of his parents, three of his four grandparents, aunts, uncles, and his stepfather battle the disease. In 2016, Mortensen traveled to New York to take care of his father, who died a year later from dementia. Two years prior, Mortensen's mother also died from complications of the condition.

Mortensen was a close friend of Icelandic painter Georg Guðni Hauksson until the latter's death in 2011. He had long been an admirer of Georg Guðni's work as a landscape artist, and the two published books together as well as maintaining a close friendship.

 Sports 
Mortensen has expressed a liking for association football, ice hockey and baseball. His favorite teams include Argentine club San Lorenzo de Almagro, English team Fulham, Spanish team Real Madrid, Turkish team Beşiktaş, and both the Argentine and Danish national teams. His favorite soccer players are Diego Maradona and Héctor "Bambino" Veira. He is a fan of the Montreal Canadiens and wore a Canadiens shirt underneath his costume throughout the filming of the Lord of the Rings trilogy. During the 100th anniversary celebrations of the Montreal Canadiens, Mortensen introduced one of his idols, Guy Lafleur, to the crowd at the Bell Centre in Montreal. He is also a fan of the New York Mets and, in an interview promoting 2009 film The Road, was seen wearing apparel indicating his support of the Australian Football League's Collingwood Magpies. While appearing on the Late Show with David Letterman, he held a sign supporting the New York Giants of the NFL.

 Political activities 
Mortensen first endorsed Senator Bernie Sanders for U.S. president in the 2016 election. When Sanders lost the nomination, he endorsed Green Party candidate Jill Stein. He wrote an open letter just before Election Day 2016 where he listed the reasons he disagreed with Hillary Clinton and could not support her in the race against Donald Trump, though he thought that Clinton would be elected president. He went on to narrate a viral documentary, The Revolution Televised, about the 2016 presidential election and the protests in the aftermath of the Democratic National Convention.

As of 2018 Mortensen has been a member of the Catalan NGO Òmnium Cultural, a pro-independence organization dedicated to promoting Catalan culture and language in the arts and the public sphere. His longtime partner and her extended family are known supporters of the 2017 Catalan independence referendum. In 2019, he publicly criticized the use of his character Aragorn by the far-right Spanish party Vox during the campaign for the 2019 Spanish general election. He was one of the signees of the "Toronto Declaration" protesting against spotlighting Tel Aviv at the Toronto International Film Festival in 2009.

 Filmography 

Video games

 Awards and nominations 

Following his appearance in the Lord of the Rings'' trilogy, in 2006 he was granted an honorary doctorate by his alma mater, St. Lawrence University.

On October 13, 2006, he was awarded the Gold Medal of the Province and the City of León, Spain.

On April 16, 2010, he was awarded the Knight's Cross of the Order of the Dannebrog.

See also 
 List of actors with Academy Award nominations

References

External links 

 
 
 
 Perceval Press Viggo Mortensen's publishing house
 Viggo Mortensen at BAFTA, A Life in Pictures event
 

1958 births
20th-century American male actors
20th-century American painters
20th-century Danish male actors
20th-century Danish male writers
20th-century Danish painters
20th-century Danish poets
21st-century American male actors
21st-century American male writers
21st-century American painters
21st-century Danish male actors
21st-century Danish painters
21st-century Danish poets
American emigrants to Argentina
American expatriates in Argentina
American expatriates in Denmark
American expatriates in Venezuela
American Lutherans
American male film actors
American male painters
American male poets
American male television actors
American male video game actors
American male voice actors
American people of Canadian descent
American people of Danish descent
American people of English descent
American people of Norwegian descent
American photographers
Painters from New York City
Best Supporting Actor Genie and Canadian Screen Award winners
Bodil Honorary Award recipients
Danish Lutherans
Danish male film actors
Danish male poets
Danish people of American descent
Danish people of Canadian descent
Danish people of English descent
Danish people of Norwegian descent
Danish photographers
Knights of the Order of the Dannebrog
Living people
Male actors from New York City
Method actors
Outstanding Performance by a Cast in a Motion Picture Screen Actors Guild Award winners
People from Sandpoint, Idaho
People from Watertown, New York
St. Lawrence University alumni
20th-century American male artists